Scale out File Services (SoFS) is a highly scalable, grid-based NAS implementation developed by IBM. It is based on IBM's high-performance shared-disk clustered file system Spectrum Scale. SoFS exports the clustered file system through industry standard protocols like SMB, NFS, FTP and HTTP. Released in 2007, SoFS is a second generation file services architecture used within IBM since 2001.

All of the SoFS nodes in the grid export all files of all file systems simultaneously. This is a different approach from some other clustered NAS implementations which pin individual files to a single node or pair of nodes thus limiting the single file performance dramatically. Each file system can be multiple petabytes in size.

SoFS combines proprietary IBM technology (block storage and compute servers and Spectrum Scale) with open source components including Linux, Samba, and CTDB.

Since February 2010, IBM is offering a hardened appliance version of SoFS, called Scale Out Network Attached Storage  (SONAS). SONAS includes a subset of the described software stack plus a new management layer. Major differences are a strict hardware support matrix, integrated high-density disk storage, and a delivery model with a standard IBM product warranty. Technically, SONAS uses an internal Infiniband network to get low latency and high cluster throughput. The cluster architecture is derived from leading Top500 supercomputer designs.

See also
 IBM Spectrum Scale
 Lustre (file system)

References
 IBM Corp. (2007-10-07). "IBM Storage Optimization and Integration Services—scale out file services". Data sheet (GTD01407-USEN-01) retrieved on 2008-01-07.
 IBM Corp. (2008-01-18). "Kantana Selects IBM Scale-Out File Services to Boost Its Data Storage System for Animation Production". Press release retrieved on 2008-01-23
 IBM Corp. (2008-06-18). "IBM Scale out File Services: Reinventing network-attached storage"
 IBM video (2011-01-11) SONAS and Why Smart Businesses are Turning to Cloud Storage
 IBM video (2008) customer reference video featuring SoFS at Kantana Animations

External links
 IBM NAS Technology Blog by Richard Swain
 IBM Scale Out File and Object Storage
 IBM storage optimization and integration services -> SoFS
 IBM Power Systems scale-out servers

Storage software
Storage systems
Computer storage technologies
IBM storage software